John Ralph Ragazzini (January 3, 1912 – November 22, 1988) was an American electrical engineer and a professor of Electrical Engineering.

Biography
Ragazzini was born in Manhattan, New York City from Italian immigrants Luigi Ragazzini and Angelina Badelli  and received the degrees of B.S. and E.E. at the City College of New York in 1932 and 1933 and earned the degrees of A.M. and Ph.D. in Electrical Engineering at Columbia University in 1939 and 1941.

Ragazzini was dean of the School of Engineering and Science at New York University and during World War II he was chairman of the Department of Electrical Engineering at Columbia University, where he was involved in the Manhattan Project.  He also served as a technical aide for the National Defense Research Committee, supervising research in the fields of Ultra high frequency transmitters and receivers, Analog computers and control systems.

Ragazzini's notable students are Rudolf E. Kálmán (known for Kalman filters), Eliahu Ibraham Jury (known for Z-transform), Gene F. Franklin (known for digital control), and Lotfi Asker Zadeh (known for fuzzy sets and fuzzy logic).

Ragazzini is also credited, along with Lotfi Zadeh, in 1952, to have pioneered the development of the z-transform method in discrete-time signal processing and analysis. 

In 1970 he received the Rufus Oldenburger Medal. In 1979, American Automatic Control Council named John R. Ragazzini Award after Ragazzini and he was the first recipient of the award. Ragazzini died on 22 November 1988, aged 76.

See also
Control theory
Operational amplifier

References

External links 
 John R. Ragazzini's Obituary in New York Times

1912 births
1988 deaths
American people of Italian descent
Control theorists
Polytechnic Institute of New York University faculty
Columbia School of Engineering and Applied Science alumni